Zuniga Glacier is a glacier flowing west-northwest into Dotson Ice Shelf between Jeffrey Head and Mount Bodziony on the west side of Bear Peninsula, Walgreen Coast, Marie Byrd Land. Mapped by United States Geological Survey (USGS) from aerial photographs taken by U.S. Navy Operation Highjump in 1947 and U.S. Navy in 1966, it was named by Advisory Committee on Antarctic Names (US-ACAN) after Mike "Iron Mike" Zuniga, Chief Aviation Storekeeper, U.S. Navy, who made seven Deep Freeze deployments between 1960 and 1978.

References

Glaciers of Marie Byrd Land